The VL15 (Russian: ВЛ15) is a Soviet built electric mainline freight locomotive manufactured at the Tbilisi Electric Locomotive Works. The power supply was 3 kV Direct Current, and the axle arrangement Bo-Bo-Bo+Bo-Bo-Bo.

All VL15 and VL15S locomotives currently in operation are assigned to the Volkhov Locomotive Depot, October Railway. 5 of 6 VL15A locomotives (VL15A-001 decommissioned) are in operation at the Apatit.

Gallery

Main users
VL15s have been used by two users:
 Russian Railways
 October Railway
 Apatit

See also 
 VL10
 VL11
 VL85

Literatures

References

External links

 
 
 

Electric locomotives of Russia
Electric locomotives of the Soviet Union
3000 V DC locomotives
Railway locomotives introduced in 1984
5 ft gauge locomotives
Bo-Bo-Bo locomotives
Bo′Bo′Bo′ locomotives